Harfordia is the scientific name of two genera of organisms and may refer to:

Harfordia (gastropod), a genus of sea snails in the family Fasciolariidae
Harfordia (plant), a genus of plants in the family Polygonaceae